Keul may refer to:

 KEUL, radio station in Alaska
 Keul, crater on Mars
 Katja Keul (born 1969), German politician
 Siri Keul, Norwegian handball player